Damiano Michieletto (born 1975) is an Italian stage director especially known for opera.  He has staged productions at leading opera houses and festivals worldwide.
His awards include the 2015 Laurence Olivier Award for the production of Mascagni's Cavalleria rusticana and  Leoncavallo's Pagliacci at the Royal Opera House in London.

Career 
Michieletto was born in Venice and grew up in Scorzè, a village in the Metropolitan City of Venice. He graduated in literature at the Ca' Foscari University of Venice, and directing at the Scuola d'Arte Drammatica Paolo Grassi in Milan. He made his directing debut with a production of Weinberger's Švanda dudákat at the Wexford Festival in 2003.

He is a specialist for works by Gioacchino Rossini with a critically acclaimed debut at the Rossini Opera Festival in Pesaro in 2007.  At La Fenice in his hometown, he directed Mozart's three operas on librettos by Lorenzo da Ponte. He staged some rarely performed operas by Ramón Carnicer, Michael Daugherty, Nino Rota, Stefano Pavesi and Marco Tutino. In 2012, he made his debut at both the Salzburg Festival, where he directed Puccini's La Bohème, and at the Theater an der Wien, where he directed the same composer's Il trittico.

Michieletto directed at La Scala in Milan, for the first time in the 2013/14 season, a production of Verdi' Un ballo in maschera. At the Salzburg Festival, he directed again Verdi's Falstaff,  Rossini's La Cenerentola, with Cecilia Bartoli in the title role. He made his London debut in June 2015, staging Rossini's Guillaume Tell at the Royal Opera House. 

Michieletto directed Massenet's Cendrillon at the Komische Oper Berlin in 2016 and the world premiere of Filippo Perocco's  at La Fenice in 2016, written on a commission on the occasion of the 50th anniversary of the 1966 acqua alta flooding. In 2019, Michieletto directed Franz Schreker's Der ferne Klang at the Oper Frankfurt, where the world premiere had taken place in 1912.

For RAI television in 2017 he was invited by popstar Mika (singer) to collaborate in the realization of the CasaMika2 program on Rai 2. In 2020 he is the creator, author and host of the program Il volo del calabrone on Rai 5.

In 2021 Michieletto makes his debut at Berlin State Opera with Jenufa conducted by Simon Rattle and comes back to La Scala Milan with Salome by Strauss.

Productions 
 2003 Švanda dudákat – Wexford Festival Opera
 2004 Il trionfo delle belle by Stefano Pavesi – Rossini Opera Festival, Pesaro
 2006 Il dissoluto punito by Ramón Carnicier – Festival La Coruña
 2007 La gazza ladra – Rossini Opera Festival
 2007 Il cappello di paglia di Firenze by Nino Rota – Teatro Carlo Felice, Genua
 2008 Lucia di Lammermoor – Opernhaus Zürich
 2008 Jackie O by Michael Daugherty – Lugo Opera Festival 
 2009 Roméo et Juliette – La Fenice
 2009 Die Entführung aus dem Serail – Teatro San Carlo, Neapel
 2009 La scala di seta – Rossini Opera Festival
 2010 Il corsaro – Opernhaus Zürich
 2010 Don Giovanni – La Fenice
 2010 Tramonto by Renato Simoni – Teatro Stabile del Veneto 
 2010 Madama Butterfly – Teatro Regio, Turin
 2010 Sigismondo – Rossini Opera Festival
 2011 Le nozze di Figaro – La Fenice
 2011 The Greek Passion by Bohuslav Martinů – Teatro Massimo, Palermo
 2012 Il ventaglio – Teatro Stabile del Veneto
 2012 Così fan tutte – La Fenice / Liceu, Barcelona
 2012 La Bohème – Salzburg Festival
 2012 Il trittico – Theater an der Wien, Copenhagen Opera House
 2013 Un ballo in maschera – La Scala, Milano
 2013 Falstaff – Salzburg Festival
 2013 Idomeneo – Theater an der Wien
 2014 L’ispettore generale – Teatro Stabile del Veneto
 2014 The Rake’s Progress – Opernhaus Leipzig, La Fenice
 2014 La Cenerentola –  Salzburg Festival
 2015 Il viaggio a Reims – Dutch National Opera
 2015 Divine Parole (Divinas Palabras by Ramón María del Valle-Inclán – Piccolo Teatro di Milano
 2015 Guillaume Tell – Royal Opera House, London
 2015 Die Zauberflöte – La Fenice
 2015 Cavalleria rusticana , Pagliacci – Royal Opera House
 2016 Otello by Rossini – Theater an der Wien
 2016 Die Dreigroschenoper – Piccolo Teatro di Milan
 2016 Cendrillon – Komische Oper Berlin
 2016 Samson et Dalila - Opéra de Paris
 2016  – world premiere, La Fenice
 2017 La Damnation de Faust – Teatro dell'Opera di Roma 
 2018 Midsummer Night's Dream – Theater an der Wien 
 2018 Don Pasquale  – Opéra de Paris 
 2019 Macbeth – La Fenice
 2019 Der ferne Klang – Oper Frankfurt
 2019 Alcina – Salzburg Pentecost Festival
 2020 Rigoletto – Circo Massimo, Teatro dell’Opera Roma
 2020 Béatrice et Bénédict – Opéra national de Lyon
 2021 Salome – La Scala Milano
 2021 Jenůfa – Berlin State Opera
 2021 Kát'a Kabanová – Glyndebourne Festival

Awards 

 2003 Irish Times Theatre Awards – Best Opera Production, for Schwanda
 2008 Franco Abbiati Prize – Best Director, for La gazza ladra
 2013 Reumert Prize – Best Opera Production, for Il Trittico
 2015 Österreichischer Musiktheaterpreis – category Beste Regie, for Idomeneo at the Theater an der Wien
 2015 Laurence Olivier Award – Best Opera Production, for Cavalleria rusticana – Pagliacci
 2017 Franco Abbiati Prize – Best Director, for Aquagranda
 2018 Franco Abbiati Prize – Best Opera Production, for La Damnation de Faust
 2018 Melbourne Green Room Awards - Best Director, for Cavalleria Rusticana - Pagliacci
 2019 Casta Diva Award - Best Opera Production, for "Il viaggio a Reims"
 2020 Melbourne Green Room Award - Best Opera Production, for "Il viaggio a Reims"

References

External links 
 
 Das Bühnenbild ist die halbe Miete (in German) welt.de, retrieved 23 October 2010
 Franz Schreker: Der ferne Klang Oper Frankfurt 2019

Living people
Italian opera directors
Ca' Foscari University of Venice alumni
1975 births